HMS Porpoise (S01) was a Porpoise-class submarine of the Royal Navy. She was launched on 25 April 1956, commissioned on 17 April 1958, and was decommissioned in 1982. Finally, she was sunk as a target in 1985 in torpedo trials, for which purpose she was painted bright red.

She had been used as a training target while still serving with the Navy; in 1979 her casing, ballast tanks and vents were reinforced so that unarmed torpedoes could be fired at her without the risk of sinking.

In 2000, a glacier in East Greenland was named after her

Commanding officers

Accidents and incidents

Notable accidents involving HMS Porpoise
 18 October 1963: Suffers superficial damage departing Portsmouth harbor after colliding with the aircraft carrier HMS Centaur.
 1 January 1969 - Entangled in the nets of the French trawler Belle Poule.
 18 April 1982 - HMS Porpoise became entangled in the fishing nets of the Irish trawler Sharelga.  The Sharelga, after travelling backwards two miles for twenty minutes, capsized and sank.

References

British Porpoise-class submarines
Ships built in Barrow-in-Furness
1956 ships
Ships sunk as targets
Maritime incidents in 1985